Yasuhigashi Station is a HRT station on Astram Line, located in 2-10-1, Yasuhigashi, Asaminami-ku, Hiroshima.

Platforms

Connections
█ Astram Line
●Bishamondai — ●Yasuhigashi — ●Kamiyasu Station

Around station
Yasuda Women's University
Yasuda Women's College

History
Opened on August 20, 1994.

See also
Astram Line
Hiroshima Rapid Transit

References

Yasuhigashi Station